Eugenia is a large, broadly distributed genus of flowering trees, shrubs, and subshrubs in the myrtle family, Myrtaceae. , there are over 1,100 accepted species in Kew's Plants of the World Online.

A
 Eugenia abbreviata Urb.
 Eugenia aboukirensis Proctor
 Eugenia abunan M.A.D.Souza & Sobral
 Eugenia acapulcensis Steud.
 Eugenia aceitillo Urb.
 Eugenia acrantha Urb.
 Eugenia acrensis McVaugh
 Eugenia acrisepala Govaerts
 Eugenia acunae Alain
 Eugenia acutissima Urb. & Ekman
 Eugenia adenantha O.Berg
 Eugenia adenocarpa O.Berg
 Eugenia aequatoriensis M.L.Kawas. & B.Holst
 Eugenia aerosa McVaugh
 Eugenia aeruginea DC.
 Eugenia afzelii Engl.
 Eugenia agasthiyamalayana Gopalan & Murugan
 Eugenia agathopoda Diels
 Eugenia aherniana C.B.Rob.
 Eugenia alagoensis (O.Berg) Mattos
 Eugenia alainii Borhidi
 Eugenia alaotrensis H.Perrier
 Eugenia albicans (O.Berg) Urb.
 Eugenia albimarginata Urb. & Ekman
 Eugenia alletiana Baider & V.Florens
 Eugenia alnifolia McVaugh
 Eugenia aloysii C.J.Saldanha
 Eugenia alpina (Sw.) Willd.
 Eugenia altissima Sobral & Faria
 Eugenia altoalegre Sobral & M.A.D.Souza
 Eugenia amatenangensis Lundell
 Eugenia ambanizanensis N.Snow
 Eugenia amblyophylla Urb.
 Eugenia amblyosepala McVaugh
 Eugenia amoena Thwaites
 Eugenia amorimii Fraga & Giaretta
 Eugenia amosensis N.Snow
 Eugenia ampla M.L.Kawas. & B.Holst
 Eugenia amplifolia Urb.
 Eugenia amshoffiae McVaugh
 Eugenia anafensis Urb.
 Eugenia analamerensis H.Perrier
 Eugenia anamalaiensis E.S.S.Kumar, Veldkamp & Shareef
 Eugenia anastomosans DC.
 Eugenia ancorifera Amshoff
 Eugenia andapae N.Snow
 Eugenia angelyana Mattos
 Eugenia angustissima O.Berg
 Eugenia ankarensis (H.Perrier) A.J.Scott
 Eugenia anomala D.Legrand
 Eugenia anthacanthoides Urb. & Ekman
 Eugenia antongilensis H.Perrier
 Eugenia arawakorum Sandwith
 Eugenia arayan Seem.
 Eugenia ardisioides Lundell
 Eugenia ardyceae N.Snow
 Eugenia arenaria Cambess.
 Eugenia arenicola H.Perrier
 Eugenia arenosa Mattos
 Eugenia argentea Bedd.
 Eugenia argyrophylla B.Holst & M.L.Kawas.
 Eugenia armeniaca Sagot
 Eugenia arrabidae O.Berg
 Eugenia arrhaphocalyx Barrie, I.Vergara & McPherson
 Eugenia arthroopoda Baill. ex Drake
 Eugenia arvensis Vell.
 Eugenia aschersoniana F.Hoffm.
 Eugenia asema Sobral, I.G.Costa & M.C.Souza
 Eugenia asperifolia O.Berg
 Eugenia astringens Cambess.
 Eugenia atricha Urb.
 Eugenia atroracemosa McVaugh
 Eugenia atrosquamata McVaugh
 Eugenia augustana Kiaersk.
 Eugenia aurata O.Berg
 Eugenia austin-smithii Standl.
 Eugenia avicenniae Standl.
 Eugenia axillaris (Sw.) Willd.
 Eugenia azeda Sobral
 Eugenia azurensis O.Berg

B
 Eugenia bacopari D.Legrand
 Eugenia badia O.Berg
 Eugenia bahiana Mattos
 Eugenia bahiensis DC.
 Eugenia bahorucana Alain
 Eugenia baileyi Britton
 Eugenia bajaverapazana Lundell
 Eugenia balancanensis Lundell
 Eugenia balansae Guillaumin
 Eugenia banderensis Urb.
 Eugenia barbata McVaugh
 Eugenia barbosae Barb.Rodr. ex Chodat & Hassl.
 Eugenia barrana Sobral
 Eugenia barriei N.Snow
 Eugenia basilaris McVaugh
 Eugenia batingabranca Sobral
 Eugenia bayatensis Urb.
 Eugenia belemitana McVaugh
 Eugenia belladerensis Urb. & Ekman
 Eugenia belloi Barrie
 Eugenia bellonis Krug & Urb.
 Eugenia bemangidiensis N.Snow
 Eugenia bergii Nied.
 Eugenia biflora (L.) DC.
 Eugenia bimarginata DC.
 Eugenia binata Mazine & Sobral
 Eugenia blanchetiana O.Berg
 Eugenia blanda Sobral
 Eugenia blastantha (O.Berg) D.Legrand
 Eugenia bojeri Baker
 Eugenia boliviana (D.Legrand) Mattos
 Eugenia boqueronensis Britton
 Eugenia borhidiana Z.Acosta
 Eugenia borinquensis Britton
 Eugenia bosseri J.Guého & A.J.Scott
 Eugenia botequimensis Kiaersk.
 Eugenia brachyblastiflora Barrie, C.A.Ramos & O.Ortiz
 Eugenia brachyclada Urb. & Ekman
 Eugenia brachysepala Kiaersk.
 Eugenia brasiliana Aubl.
 Eugenia brasiliensis Lam.
 Eugenia breedlovei Barrie
 Eugenia brejoensis Mazine
 Eugenia breteleri Jongkind
 Eugenia brevipedunculata Kiaersk.
 Eugenia brevipes A.Rich.
 Eugenia breviracemosa Mazine
 Eugenia brevistyla D.Legrand
 Eugenia brongniartiana Guillaumin
 Eugenia brownei Urb.
 Eugenia brownsbergii Amshoff
 Eugenia brunneopubescens Mazine
 Eugenia bryanii Kaneh.
 Eugenia buchholzii Engl.
 Eugenia bukobensis Engl.
 Eugenia bullata Pancher ex Guillaumin
 Eugenia bullatifolia M.L.Kawas. & Á.J.Pérez
 Eugenia bumelioides Standl.
 Eugenia bunchosiifolia Nied.
 Eugenia burkartiana (D.Legrand) D.Legrand
 Eugenia buxifolia Lam.
 Eugenia byssacea McVaugh

C
 Eugenia caatingicola K.Cout. & M.Ibrahim
 Eugenia cachoeirensis O.Berg
 Eugenia cacuminum Standl. & Steyerm.
 Eugenia caducibracteata Mazine
 Eugenia caducipetala M.A.D.Souza & Scud.
 Eugenia cahosiana Urb. & Ekman
 Eugenia cajalbanica Borhidi & O.Muñiz
 Eugenia calcadensis Bedd.
 Eugenia calciscopulorum N.Snow
 Eugenia calimensis Parra-Os.
 Eugenia callichroma McVaugh
 Eugenia caloneura Sobral & Rigueira
 Eugenia calophylloides DC.
 Eugenia calumettae Urb. & Ekman
 Eugenia calva McVaugh
 Eugenia calycina Cambess.
 Eugenia canapuensis Urb.
 Eugenia candolleana DC.
 Eugenia cantuana Lundell
 Eugenia capensis (Eckl. & Zeyh.) Harv.
 Eugenia capillipes Borhidi
 Eugenia capitulifera O.Berg
 Eugenia capixaba Mazine
 Eugenia capparidifolia DC.
 Eugenia capuli (Schltdl. & Cham.) Hook. &
 Eugenia capulioides Lundell
 Eugenia cararensis Barrie & Q.Jiménez
 Eugenia cartagensis O.Berg
 Eugenia casearioides (Kunth) DC.
 Eugenia cassinoides Lam.
 Eugenia castaneiflora M.L.Kawas. & B.Holst
 Eugenia cataphyllea M.C.Souza & Sobral
 Eugenia catharinae O.Berg
 Eugenia catharinensis D.Legrand
 Eugenia catingiflora Griseb.
 Eugenia cayoana Lundell
 Eugenia ceibana Urb.
 Eugenia cerasiflora Miq.
 Eugenia cereja D.Legrand
 Eugenia cerrocacaoensis Barrie
 Eugenia cervina Standl. & Steyerm.
 Eugenia chacoensis (D.Legrand) Kausel
 Eugenia chacueyana Alain
 Eugenia chahalana Lundell
 Eugenia chartacea McVaugh
 Eugenia chavarriae Barrie
 Eugenia chepensis Standl.
 Eugenia chiapensis Lundell
 Eugenia chinajensis Standl. & Steyerm.
 Eugenia chiquitensis O.Berg
 Eugenia chlorocarpa O.Berg
 Eugenia chlorophylla O.Berg
 Eugenia choapamensis Standl.
 Eugenia choungiensis Byng & N.Snow
 Eugenia christii Urb.
 Eugenia chrootricha Urb. & Ekman
 Eugenia chrootrichoides Proctor
 Eugenia chrysobalanoides DC.
 Eugenia chrysophyllum Poir.
 Eugenia churutensis Cornejo
 Eugenia cincta Griseb.
 Eugenia cinerascens Gardner
 Eugenia citrifolia Poir.
 Eugenia citroides Lundell
 Eugenia clarendonensis Urb.
 Eugenia clarensis Britton & P.Wilson
 Eugenia cloiselii H.Perrier
 Eugenia coaetanea O.Berg
 Eugenia coccifera O.Berg
 Eugenia coccinea K.Cout. & M.Ibrahim
 Eugenia cocosensis Barrie
 Eugenia codyensis Munro ex Wight
 Eugenia coffeifolia DC.
 Eugenia coibensis Barrie
 Eugenia colipensis O.Berg
 Eugenia columbiensis O.Berg
 Eugenia commutata O.Berg
 Eugenia complicata O.Berg
 Eugenia concava B.Holst & M.L.Kawas.
 Eugenia conchalensis D.Legrand & Mattos
 Eugenia concolor Mattos
 Eugenia conduplicata B.Holst
 Eugenia confusa DC.
 Eugenia congolensis De Wild. & T.Durand
 Eugenia conjuncta Amshoff
 Eugenia consolatae Chiov.
 Eugenia constanzae Alain
 Eugenia convexinervia D.Legrand
 Eugenia copacabanensis Kiaersk.
 Eugenia corcovadensis Kiaersk.
 Eugenia cordata (Sw.) DC.
 Eugenia cordillerana Mattos
 Eugenia coronata Vahl ex DC.
 Eugenia corrientina Barb.Rodr.
 Eugenia corusca Barrie
 Eugenia costaricensis O.Berg
 Eugenia costatifructa Mazine
 Eugenia cotinifolia Jacq.
 Eugenia coursiana H.Perrier
 Eugenia cowanii McVaugh
 Eugenia cowellii Britton & P.Wilson
 Eugenia coyolensis Standl.
 Eugenia crassa Sobral
 Eugenia crassicaulis Proctor
 Eugenia crassimarginata M.L.Kawas. & B.Holst
 Eugenia crassipetala J.Guého & A.J.Scott
 Eugenia craveniana N.Snow & Peter G.Wilson
 Eugenia crenata Vell.
 Eugenia crenularis Lundell
 Eugenia crenulata (Sw.) Willd.
 Eugenia cribrata McVaugh
 Eugenia cricamolensis Standl.
 Eugenia cristaensis O.Berg
 Eugenia cristalensis Urb.
 Eugenia cristata C.Wright
 Eugenia crossopterygoides A.Chev.
 Eugenia crucicalyx McVaugh
 Eugenia crucigera Däniker
 Eugenia cuaoensis McVaugh
 Eugenia cucullata Amshoff
 Eugenia culicina Sobral
 Eugenia culminicola McVaugh
 Eugenia culta Sobral
 Eugenia cupulata Amshoff
 Eugenia cupuligera Urb.
 Eugenia curvipilosa McVaugh
 Eugenia curvivenia McVaugh
 Eugenia cuspidifolia DC.
 Eugenia cycloidea Urb.
 Eugenia cyclophylla O.Berg
 Eugenia cydoniifolia O.Berg
 Eugenia cymatodes O.Berg
 Eugenia cyphophloea Griseb.

D
 Eugenia daaouiensis Guillaumin
 Eugenia daenikeri Guillaumin
 Eugenia darcyi Barrie
 Eugenia decussata (Vell.) Mattos
 Eugenia delicatissima N.Snow, Callm. & Phillipson
 Eugenia delpechiana Urb. & Ekman
 Eugenia demeusei De Wild.
 Eugenia denigrata McVaugh
 Eugenia densiracemosa Mazine & Faria
 Eugenia dentata (O.Berg) Nied.
 Eugenia dewevrei De Wild. & T.Durand
 Eugenia dibrachiata McVaugh
 Eugenia dichroma O.Berg
 Eugenia dictyophleba O.Berg
 Eugenia dictyophylla Urb.
 Eugenia diminutiflora Amshoff
 Eugenia dimorpha O.Berg
 Eugenia dinklagei Engl. & Brehmer
 Eugenia diospyroides H.Perrier
 Eugenia dipetala Sobral & L.Kollmann
 Eugenia diplocampta Diels
 Eugenia discifera Gamble
 Eugenia discolorans C.Wright
 Eugenia discors McVaugh
 Eugenia discreta McVaugh
 Eugenia disperma Vell.
 Eugenia disticha (Sw.) DC.
 Eugenia dittocrepis O.Berg
 Eugenia dodoana Engl. & Brehmer
 Eugenia dodonaeifolia Cambess.
 Eugenia domingensis O.Berg
 Eugenia donosoensis Barrie, C.A.Ramos & O.Ortiz
 Eugenia doubledayi Standl.
 Eugenia duarteana Cambess.
 Eugenia duchassaingiana O.Berg
 Eugenia dulcis O.Berg
 Eugenia dumosa (Vahl) DC.
 Eugenia duplicata Britton & P.Wilson ex Acev.-Rodr.
 Eugenia dusenii Engl.
 Eugenia dussii Krug & Urb.
 Eugenia dysenterica DC.

E
 Eugenia earhartii Acev.-Rodr.
 Eugenia earlei Britton & P.Wilson
 Eugenia earthiana P.E.Sánchez
 Eugenia echinulata N.Snow
 Eugenia egensis DC.
 Eugenia eggersii Kiaersk.
 Eugenia ehrenbergiana O.Berg
 Eugenia ekmanii (Urb.) Flickinger
 Eugenia eliasii Lundell
 Eugenia elliotii Engl. & Brehmer
 Eugenia ellipsoidea Kiaersk.
 Eugenia elliptica Lam.
 Eugenia elongata Nied.
 Eugenia emarginata (Kunth) DC.
 Eugenia ependytes McVaugh
 Eugenia eperforata Urb.
 Eugenia eriantha Urb.
 Eugenia ericoides Guillaumin
 Eugenia erythrocarpa (Kunth) DC.
 Eugenia erythrophylla Strey
 Eugenia erythroxyloides Mart. ex O.Berg
 Eugenia espinhacensis Bünger & Sobral
 Eugenia essequiboensis Sandwith
 Eugenia esteliensis Barrie
 Eugenia eurycheila O.Berg
 Eugenia exaltata A.Rich. ex O.Berg
 Eugenia excelsa O.Berg
 Eugenia excisa Urb.
 Eugenia excoriata O.Berg
 Eugenia expansa Spring ex Mart.

F
 Eugenia fajardensis (Krug & Urb.) Urb.
 Eugenia farameoides A.Rich.
 Eugenia farinacea Barrie
 Eugenia farneyi Faria & Proença
 Eugenia fernandez-alonsoi Parra-Os.
 Eugenia fernandopoana Engl. & Brehmer
 Eugenia ferreiraeana O.Berg
 Eugenia flamingensis O.Berg
 Eugenia flavescens DC.
 Eugenia flavoviridis Lundell
 Eugenia fleuryi A.Chev.
 Eugenia floccosa Bedd.
 Eugenia florida DC.
 Eugenia floscellus D.Legrand
 Eugenia fluminensis O.Berg
 Eugenia foetida Pers.
 Eugenia fortuita M.A.D.Souza & Sobral
 Eugenia francavilleana O.Berg
 Eugenia froesii McVaugh
 Eugenia fulva Thwaites
 Eugenia funchiana K.Cout. & M.Ibrahim
 Eugenia funkiana O.Berg
 Eugenia fusca O.Berg
 Eugenia fuscopunctata Kiaersk.

G
 Eugenia gabonensis Amshoff
 Eugenia gacognei Montrouz.
 Eugenia galalonensis (C.Wright ex Griseb.) Krug &
 Eugenia galbaoensis Mattos
 Eugenia galeata Urb.
 Eugenia gandhii N.Snow
 Eugenia gastropogena Faria & Proença
 Eugenia gatopensis Guillaumin
 Eugenia gaudichaudiana O.Berg
 Eugenia gaumeri Standl.
 Eugenia gemmiflora O.Berg
 Eugenia geraensis (D.Legrand & Mattos) Mattos
 Eugenia gerdae Mazine
 Eugenia gibberosa Urb.
 Eugenia gigas Lundell
 Eugenia gilgii Engl. & Brehmer
 Eugenia glabra Alston
 Eugenia glabrata (Sw.) DC.
 Eugenia glabrescens Mazine
 Eugenia glandulosa Cambess.
 Eugenia glandulosopunctata P.E.Sánchez & Poveda
 Eugenia glomeruliflora Mazine
 Eugenia goiapabana Sobral & Mazine
 Eugenia gomesiana O.Berg
 Eugenia gomezii Barrie
 Eugenia gomonenensis (Guillaumin) J.W.Dawson & N.Snow
 Eugenia gonavensis Urb.
 Eugenia gongylocarpa M.L.Kawas. & B.Holst
 Eugenia goviala H.Perrier
 Eugenia gracilipes Kiaersk.
 Eugenia gracilis O.Berg
 Eugenia gracillima Kiaersk.
 Eugenia grandiflora O.Berg
 Eugenia grandifolia O.Berg
 Eugenia grandissima Sobral, Mazine & E.A.D.Melo
 Eugenia grayumii Barrie
 Eugenia greggii (Sw.) Poir.
 Eugenia grifensis Urb.
 Eugenia grijalvae Barrie
 Eugenia grisebachii Krug & Urb.
 Eugenia griseiflora McVaugh
 Eugenia grisiana Guillaumin
 Eugenia grossa B.Holst & M.L.Kawas.
 Eugenia gryposperma Krug & Urb.
 Eugenia guajavoides N.Snow & Randriat.
 Eugenia guanensis Urb.
 Eugenia guatemalensis Donn.Sm.
 Eugenia guayaquilensis (Kunth) DC.
 Eugenia guillotii Hochr.
 Eugenia gyrosepala Baker f.

H
 Eugenia haberi Barrie
 Eugenia haematocarpa Alain
 Eugenia haitiensis Krug & Urb.
 Eugenia hamiltonii (Mattos) Mattos
 Eugenia hammelii Barrie
 Eugenia handroana D.Legrand
 Eugenia handroi (Mattos) Mattos
 Eugenia hanoverensis Proctor
 Eugenia haputalense Kosterm.
 Eugenia harrisii Krug & Urb.
 Eugenia hartmanniae Mattos
 Eugenia hartshornii Barrie
 Eugenia hastilis (Blume) J.Guého & A.J.Scott
 Eugenia hatschbachii Mazine
 Eugenia hazompasika H.Perrier
 Eugenia hazonjia N.Snow
 Eugenia herbacea O.Berg
 Eugenia heringeriana Mattos
 Eugenia hermesiana Mattos
 Eugenia herrerae Barrie
 Eugenia heterochroa Urb.
 Eugenia heterochroma Diels
 Eugenia heterophylla A.Rich.
 Eugenia hexovulata McVaugh
 Eugenia hiemalis Cambess.
 Eugenia higueyana Alain
 Eugenia hilariana DC.
 Eugenia hiraeifolia Standl.
 Eugenia hirta O.Berg
 Eugenia hispidiflora Sobral & M.C.Souza
 Eugenia hodgei McVaugh
 Eugenia holdridgei Alain
 Eugenia homedeboana N.Snow
 Eugenia hondurensis Ant.Molina
 Eugenia horizontalis Pancher ex Brongn. & Gris
 Eugenia hovarum H.Perrier
 Eugenia howardiana Proctor
 Eugenia huasteca Sánchez-Cháv. & Zamudio
 Eugenia humblotii Engl. & Brehmer
 Eugenia hurlimannii Guillaumin
 Eugenia hypargyrea Standl.

I
 Eugenia iantarensis N.Snow
 Eugenia ibarrae Lundell
 Eugenia ignota Britton & P.Wilson
 Eugenia ilalensis Hieron.
 Eugenia illepida McVaugh
 Eugenia imaruiensis D.Legrand
 Eugenia imbricata O.Berg
 Eugenia imbricatocordata Amshoff
 Eugenia impressa (O.Berg) Mattos
 Eugenia impunctata O.Berg
 Eugenia inaequisepala Peter G.Wilson
 Eugenia incanescens Benth.
 Eugenia inconspicua Standl.
 Eugenia indica (Wight) Chithra
 Eugenia indistincta Sobral & Stadnik
 Eugenia inirebensis P.E.Sánchez
 Eugenia intermedia O.Berg
 Eugenia intibucana Barrie
 Eugenia inundata DC.
 Eugenia inversa Sobral
 Eugenia involucrata DC.
 Eugenia irazuensis Hemsl.
 Eugenia irirensis O.Berg
 Eugenia isabeliana Kiaersk.
 Eugenia ischnosceles O.Berg
 Eugenia isosticta Urb.
 Eugenia itacarensis Mattos
 Eugenia itaguahiensis Nied.
 Eugenia itahypensis O.Berg
 Eugenia itajurensis Cambess.
 Eugenia itapemirimensis Cambess.
 Eugenia itararensis (Mattos) Mattos
 Eugenia iteophylla Krug & Urb.
 Eugenia izabalana Lundell

J
 Eugenia jambosoides C.Wright ex Griseb.
 Eugenia janeirensis O.Berg
 Eugenia jimenezii Alain
 Eugenia joenssonii Kausel
 Eugenia joseramosii M.A.D.Souza & Scud.
 Eugenia jutiapensis Standl. & Steyerm.

K
 Eugenia kaalensis Guillaumin
 Eugenia kaieteurensis Amshoff
 Eugenia kalbreyeri Engl. & Brehmer
 Eugenia kamelii Merr.
 Eugenia kameruniana Engl.
 Eugenia kanakana N.Snow
 Eugenia karwinskyana O.Berg
 Eugenia kellyana Proctor
 Eugenia kerianthera M.A.D.Souza
 Eugenia kerstingii Engl. & Brehmer
 Eugenia klaineana (Pierre) Engl.
 Eugenia kleinii D.Legrand
 Eugenia klotzschiana O.Berg
 Eugenia koepperi Standl.
 Eugenia koolauensis O.Deg.
 Eugenia krapovickasiana Mattos
 Eugenia krukoffiana (Kausel) B.Holst
 Eugenia kuebuniensis Guillaumin

L
 Eugenia lacerosepala N.Snow
 Eugenia lacistema Sobral
 Eugenia laeteviridis Urb.
 Eugenia laevis O.Berg
 Eugenia lagoensis Kiaersk.
 Eugenia lambertiana DC.
 Eugenia lamprophylla Urb.
 Eugenia lancetillae Standl.
 Eugenia langsdorffii O.Berg
 Eugenia laruotteana Cambess.
 Eugenia latifolia Aubl.
 Eugenia laurae Proctor
 Eugenia laxa DC.
 Eugenia ledermannii Engl. & Brehmer
 Eugenia ledophylla (Standl.) McVaugh
 Eugenia legrandii (Mattos) Mattos
 Eugenia lempana Barrie
 Eugenia leonanii Mattos
 Eugenia leonensis Engl. & Brehmer
 Eugenia lepidota O.Berg
 Eugenia leptoclada O.Berg
 Eugenia letreroana Lundell
 Eugenia leucadendron O.Berg
 Eugenia levinervis (Fosberg) A.J.Scott
 Eugenia lheritieriana DC.
 Eugenia lhotzkyana O.Berg
 Eugenia libanensis Urb.
 Eugenia liberiana Amshoff
 Eugenia librevillensis Amshoff
 Eugenia liebmannii Standl.
 Eugenia liesneri Barrie
 Eugenia ligustrina (Sw.) Willd.
 Eugenia ligustroides Urb.
 Eugenia lilloana D.Legrand
 Eugenia limbosa O.Berg
 Eugenia lindahlii Urb. & Ekman
 Eugenia linearis A.Rich. ex O.Berg
 Eugenia lineata (Sw.) DC.
 Eugenia lineolata Urb. & Ekman
 Eugenia lisboae M.A.D.Souza
 Eugenia lithosperma Barrie
 Eugenia littoralis Pancher ex Brongn. & Gris
 Eugenia livida O.Berg
 Eugenia locuples Barrie
 Eugenia loeseneri Urb.
 Eugenia loheri C.B.Rob.
 Eugenia lokohensis H.Perrier
 Eugenia lomensis Britton & P.Wilson
 Eugenia lomeroensis Villarroel & Bezerra
 Eugenia longibracteata Mazine
 Eugenia longicuspis McVaugh
 Eugenia longifolia DC.
 Eugenia longipetiolata Mattos
 Eugenia longiracemosa Kiaersk.
 Eugenia longisepala M.L.Kawas. & B.Holst
 Eugenia longuensis N.Snow
 Eugenia lotoides (Guillaumin) J.W.Dawson & N.Snow
 Eugenia louisae N.Snow
 Eugenia louvelii H.Perrier
 Eugenia lucens Alain
 Eugenia luciae Amshoff
 Eugenia lucida Lam.
 Eugenia ludoviciana Gómez-Laur.
 Eugenia luschnathiana (O.Berg) Klotzsch ex B.D.Jacks.

M
 Eugenia mabaeoides Wight
 Eugenia macahensis O.Berg
 Eugenia macedoi Mattos & D.Legrand
 Eugenia mackeeana Guillaumin
 Eugenia macnabiana (Krug & Urb.) Urb.
 Eugenia macradenia Urb. & Ekman
 Eugenia macrantha O.Berg
 Eugenia macrobracteolata Mattos
 Eugenia macrocarpa Schltdl. & Cham.
 Eugenia macrosperma DC.
 Eugenia madagascariensis (H.Perrier) A.J.Scott
 Eugenia madugodaense Kosterm.
 Eugenia maestrensis Urb.
 Eugenia magna B.Holst
 Eugenia magnibracteolata Mattos & D.Legrand
 Eugenia magnifica Spring ex Mart.
 Eugenia magniflora Barrie
 Eugenia magoana Lundell
 Eugenia malacantha D.Legrand
 Eugenia malangensis (O.Hoffm.) Nied.
 Eugenia malcomberi N.Snow
 Eugenia malpighioides (Kunth) DC.
 Eugenia mandevillensis Urb.
 Eugenia mandioccensis O.Berg
 Eugenia mandonii McVaugh
 Eugenia manickamiana Murugan
 Eugenia manomboensis N.Snow
 Eugenia manonae N.Snow & Rabenant.
 Eugenia mansoi O.Berg
 Eugenia marambaiensis M.C.Souza & M.P.Lima
 Eugenia maranhaoensis G.Don
 Eugenia maricaensis G.M.Barroso
 Eugenia maritima DC.
 Eugenia marleneae M.A.D.Souza & M.Mendonça
 Eugenia marlierioides Rusby
 Eugenia marowynensis Miq.
 Eugenia marshiana Griseb.
 Eugenia matagalpensis P.E.Sánchez
 Eugenia matogrossensis Sobral
 Eugenia mattosii D.Legrand
 Eugenia matudae Lundell
 Eugenia mcphersonii Barrie
 Eugenia mcvaughii Steyerm. & Lasser
 Eugenia megaflora Govaerts
 Eugenia megalopetala Griseb.
 Eugenia melanadenia Krug & Urb.
 Eugenia melanogyna (D.Legrand) Sobral
 Eugenia membranifolia Nied.
 Eugenia memecylifolia Talbot
 Eugenia memecyloides Benth.
 Eugenia mensurensis Urb.
 Eugenia meridensis Steyerm.
 Eugenia mespiloides Lam.
 Eugenia michaelneei Villarroel & Faria
 Eugenia michoacanensis Lundell
 Eugenia micranthoides McVaugh
 Eugenia micropora DC.
 Eugenia mimus McVaugh
 Eugenia minguetii Urb.
 Eugenia minuscula McVaugh
 Eugenia modesta DC.
 Eugenia moensis Britton & P.Wilson
 Eugenia molinae Barrie
 Eugenia mollicoma Mart. ex O.Berg
 Eugenia mollifolia Urb.
 Eugenia monosperma Vell.
 Eugenia montalbanica Merr.
 Eugenia monteverdensis Barrie
 Eugenia monticola (Sw.) DC.
 Eugenia mooniana Wight
 Eugenia moonioides O.Berg
 Eugenia morii B.Holst & M.L.Kawas.
 Eugenia moritziana H.Karst.
 Eugenia moschata (Aubl.) Nied. ex T.Durand & B.D.Jacks.
 Eugenia mosenii (Kausel) Sobral
 Eugenia mouensis Baker f.
 Eugenia mozomboensis P.E.Sánchez
 Eugenia mucronata O.Berg
 Eugenia mucugensis Sobral
 Eugenia mufindiensis Verdc.
 Eugenia multicostata D.Legrand
 Eugenia multirimosa McVaugh
 Eugenia muscicola H.Perrier
 Eugenia myrcianthes Nied.
 Eugenia myrciariifolia Soares-Silva & Sobral
 Eugenia myrobalana DC.

N
 Eugenia naguana Urb.
 Eugenia nannophylla Urb. & Ekman
 Eugenia naraveana Cházaro & Franc.Gut.
 Eugenia neibensis Mattos
 Eugenia nematopoda Urb.
 Eugenia neofasciculata Bennet
 Eugenia neolaurifolia Sobral
 Eugenia neomattogrossensis Mazine
 Eugenia neomyrtifolia Sobral
 Eugenia neosericea Morais & Sobral
 Eugenia neosilvestris Sobral
 Eugenia neotristis Sobral
 Eugenia neoverrucosa Sobral
 Eugenia nervosa Lour.
 Eugenia nesiotica Standl.
 Eugenia nigerina A.Chev.
 Eugenia nigrita Lundell
 Eugenia nipensis Urb.
 Eugenia nodulosa Urb.
 Eugenia nompa H.Perrier
 Eugenia nosibensis N.Snow
 Eugenia noumeensis Guillaumin
 Eugenia nutans O.Berg

O
 Eugenia oaxacana O.Berg
 Eugenia obanensis Baker f.
 Eugenia oblongata O.Berg
 Eugenia obovatifolia N.Snow
 Eugenia obscura (Lindl.) DC.
 Eugenia ocanensis Linden ex Regel
 Eugenia ochrophloea Diels
 Eugenia octopleura Krug & Urb.
 Eugenia oerstediana O.Berg
 Eugenia ogoouensis Amshoff
 Eugenia oligadenia Urb.
 Eugenia oligandra Krug & Urb.
 Eugenia ombrophila H.Perrier
 Eugenia omissa McVaugh
 Eugenia ophthalmantha Kiaersk.
 Eugenia orbiculata Lam.
 Eugenia ouen-toroensis Guillaumin
 Eugenia ovalis O.Berg
 Eugenia ovandensis Lundell
 Eugenia oxysepala Urb.

P
 Eugenia pachnantha O.Berg
 Eugenia pachychlamys Donn.Sm.
 Eugenia pachychremastra Guillaumin
 Eugenia pachyclada D.Legrand
 Eugenia pachystachya McVaugh
 Eugenia pacifica Benth.
 Eugenia padronii Alain
 Eugenia pallidopunctata Mazine
 Eugenia paloverdensis Barrie
 Eugenia paludosa Pancher ex Brongn. & Gris
 Eugenia palumbis Merr.
 Eugenia pantagensis O.Berg
 Eugenia papalensis Standl. & Steyerm.
 Eugenia papayoensis Urb.
 Eugenia paracatuana O.Berg
 Eugenia paranahybensis O.Berg
 Eugenia paranapiacabensis Mattos
 Eugenia pardensis O.Berg
 Eugenia pasacaensis C.B.Rob.
 Eugenia pascaliana Byng, Bernardini & N.Snow
 Eugenia patens Poir.
 Eugenia patrisii Vahl
 Eugenia pauciflora DC.
 Eugenia peninsularis Urb.
 Eugenia percincta McVaugh
 Eugenia percivalii Lundell
 Eugenia percrenata McVaugh
 Eugenia perriniana Urb. & Ekman
 Eugenia persicifolia O.Berg
 Eugenia peruibensis Mattos
 Eugenia petrikensis N.Snow & Randriat.
 Eugenia petrinensis N.Snow
 Eugenia petrophila Urb.
 Eugenia philippioides H.Perrier
 Eugenia phillyreoides Trimen
 Eugenia phyllocardia Urb.
 Eugenia pia DC.
 Eugenia picardiae Krug & Urb.
 Eugenia piedraensis Urb.
 Eugenia piloesis Cambess.
 Eugenia pilosula Krug & Urb.
 Eugenia pinariensis Urb.
 Eugenia pinetorum Urb.
 Eugenia pinifolia Mart. ex O.Berg
 Eugenia pipensis A.R.Lourenço & B.S.Amorim
 Eugenia piresiana Cambess.
 Eugenia piresii Mattos
 Eugenia pisiformis Cambess.
 Eugenia pistaciifolia DC.
 Eugenia pitanga (O.Berg) Nied.
 Eugenia pithecocephala Mazine & Sobral
 Eugenia pitrensis Urb.
 Eugenia pittieri Standl.
 Eugenia platyphylla O.Berg
 Eugenia platysema O.Berg
 Eugenia pleurocarpa Standl.
 Eugenia plicata Nied.
 Eugenia plicatocostata O.Berg
 Eugenia plicatula C.Wright
 Eugenia plinioides Urb. & Ekman
 Eugenia pluricymosa H.Perrier
 Eugenia pluriflora DC.
 Eugenia plurinervia N.Snow, Munzinger & Callm.
 Eugenia pobeguinii Aubrév.
 Eugenia pocsiana Borhidi
 Eugenia pohliana DC.
 Eugenia poimbailensis (Guillaumin) J.W.Dawson & N.Snow
 Eugenia poiteaui O.Berg
 Eugenia poliensis Aubrév. & Pellegr.
 Eugenia pollicina J.Guého & A.J.Scott
 Eugenia polyadena O.Berg
 Eugenia polyclada Urb. & Ekman
 Eugenia polypora Urb.
 Eugenia polystachya Rich.
 Eugenia pomifera (Aubl.) Urb.
 Eugenia potiraguensis K.Cout. & M.Ibrahim
 Eugenia pozasia Urb. & Ekman
 Eugenia praeterita McVaugh
 Eugenia prasina O.Berg
 Eugenia principium McVaugh
 Eugenia procera (Sw.) Poir.
 Eugenia producta DC.
 Eugenia prolixa S.Moore
 Eugenia prolongata M.L.Kawas. & B.Holst
 Eugenia pronyensis Guillaumin
 Eugenia prostrata Mattos
 Eugenia protenta McVaugh
 Eugenia pruinosa D.Legrand
 Eugenia pruniformis Cambess.
 Eugenia pseudomabaeoides Kosterm.
 Eugenia pseudomalacantha D.Legrand
 Eugenia pseudopsidium Jacq.
 Eugenia psidiiflora O.Berg
 Eugenia psidioidea (J.Guého & A.J.Scott) N.Snow
 Eugenia psiloclada Urb.
 Eugenia pterocarpa Baill.
 Eugenia pteroclada Urb.
 Eugenia puberula Nied.
 Eugenia pubescens (Kunth) DC.
 Eugenia pubicalyx Alain
 Eugenia pueblana Lundell
 Eugenia pulcherrima Kiaersk.
 Eugenia punicifolia (Kunth) DC.
 Eugenia purpusii Standl.
 Eugenia pusilla N.E.Br.
 Eugenia pusilliflora M.L.Kawas. & B.Holst
 Eugenia pustulescens McVaugh
 Eugenia pycnantha Benth.
 Eugenia pyrifera Faria & Proença
 Eugenia pyriflora O.Berg
 Eugenia pyriformis Cambess.
 Eugenia pyxidata (J.Guého & A.J.Scott) N.Snow

Q
 Eugenia quadriflora H.Perrier
 Eugenia quadrijuga McVaugh
 Eugenia quadriovulata Amshoff
 Eugenia quadriphylla N.Snow & Callm.
 Eugenia quebradensis McVaugh
 Eugenia quercetorum Standl. & L.O.Williams ex Barrie
 Eugenia queretaroana Sánchez-Cháv. & Zamudio

R
 Eugenia racemiflora O.Berg
 Eugenia radiciflora H.Perrier
 Eugenia ramboi D.Legrand
 Eugenia ramiflora Desv.
 Eugenia ramonae Borhidi & O.Muñiz
 Eugenia ramoniana Urb.
 Eugenia randrianasoloi J.S.Mill.
 Eugenia ranomafana N.Snow & D.Turk
 Eugenia rara Rigueira & Sobral
 Eugenia ravelonarivoi N.Snow & Callm.
 Eugenia ravenii Lundell
 Eugenia razakamalalae N.Snow & Callm.
 Eugenia regia Bünger & Sobral
 Eugenia reinwardtiana (Blume) DC.
 Eugenia reitziana D.Legrand
 Eugenia rekoi Standl.
 Eugenia rendlei Urb.
 Eugenia repanda O.Berg
 Eugenia reticularis O.Berg
 Eugenia retinadenia C.Wright
 Eugenia rheophytica Kosterm.
 Eugenia rhombea (O.Berg) Krug & Urb.
 Eugenia richardii (Blume) N.Snow, Callm. & Phillipson
 Eugenia rigida DC.
 Eugenia rigidifolia A.Rich.
 Eugenia rigidula Britton & P.Wilson
 Eugenia rimosa C.Wright
 Eugenia riograndis Lundell
 Eugenia riosiae Barrie
 Eugenia rivulorum Thwaites
 Eugenia rizziniana Mattos
 Eugenia rizzoana Mattos
 Eugenia robustior Faria & Proença
 Eugenia rocana Britton & P.Wilson
 Eugenia rodriguesensis J.Guého & A.J.Scott
 Eugenia roigii Urb.
 Eugenia rojasiana (D.Legrand) Mattos
 Eugenia rosariensis Borhidi
 Eugenia rosea DC.
 Eugenia roseiflora McVaugh
 Eugenia roseola Barrie, C.A.Ramos & O.Ortiz
 Eugenia roseopetala Barrie, I.Vergara & McPherson
 Eugenia roseopetiolata N.Snow & Cable
 Eugenia rostrata O.Berg
 Eugenia rostratofalcata Mattos & D.Legrand
 Eugenia rostrifolia D.Legrand
 Eugenia rottleriana Wight & Arn.
 Eugenia rotula Sobral
 Eugenia rotundata (Trimen) Trimen
 Eugenia rotundicosta D.Legrand
 Eugenia roxburghii DC.
 Eugenia rubella Lundell
 Eugenia rufidula Lundell
 Eugenia rufofulva Thwaites
 Eugenia rugosissima Sobral
 Eugenia ruschiana Bünger, Mazine & Stehmann
 Eugenia ruscifolia Poir.

S
 Eugenia sachetiae Proctor
 Eugenia salacioides G.Lawson ex Hutch. & Dalziel
 Eugenia salamensis Donn.Sm.
 Eugenia salomonica G.T.White
 Eugenia samanensis Alain
 Eugenia samuelssonii Ekman & Urb.
 Eugenia sancarlosensis Barrie
 Eugenia sanjuanensis P.E.Sánchez
 Eugenia sapoensis Jongkind
 Eugenia sarapiquensis P.E.Sánchez
 Eugenia sarasinii Guillaumin
 Eugenia sargentii Merr.
 Eugenia sasoana Standl. & Steyerm.
 Eugenia sauvallei Krug & Urb.
 Eugenia savannarum Standl. & Steyerm.
 Eugenia scalariformis McVaugh
 Eugenia scaphephylla C.Wright
 Eugenia schatzii J.S.Mill.
 Eugenia scheffleri Engl. & Brehmer
 Eugenia schottiana O.Berg
 Eugenia schulziana Urb.
 Eugenia schunkei McVaugh
 Eugenia sclerocalyx D.Legrand
 Eugenia scottii H.Perrier
 Eugenia sebastiani Urb.
 Eugenia sehnemiana (Mattos) Mattos
 Eugenia seithurensis Gopalan & S.R.Sriniv.
 Eugenia selloi B.D.Jacks.
 Eugenia sellowiana DC.
 Eugenia selvana Barrie
 Eugenia sericifolia M.L.Kawas. & B.Holst
 Eugenia serraegrandis Sobral
 Eugenia serrasuela Krug & Urb.
 Eugenia serrei Urb.
 Eugenia sessiliflora Vahl
 Eugenia sessilifolia DC.
 Eugenia shaferi Urb.
 Eugenia shettyana Murugan & Gopalan
 Eugenia shimishito Barrie
 Eugenia shookii Lundell
 Eugenia sicifolia J.W.Dawson & N.Snow
 Eugenia sieberi J.Guého & A.J.Scott
 Eugenia siggersii Standl.
 Eugenia sigillata McVaugh
 Eugenia sihanakensis H.Perrier
 Eugenia siltepecana Lundell
 Eugenia sinaloae Standl.
 Eugenia singampattiana Bedd.
 Eugenia sloanei Urb.
 Eugenia sobraliana Giaretta & Fraga
 Eugenia sobralii Mattos
 Eugenia solimoensis O.Berg
 Eugenia sonderiana O.Berg
 Eugenia sooiana Borhidi
 Eugenia sotoesparzae P.E.Sánchez
 Eugenia sparsa S.Moore
 Eugenia speciosa Cambess.
 Eugenia sphenoides O.Berg
 Eugenia splendens O.Berg
 Eugenia sprengelii DC.
 Eugenia spruceana O.Berg
 Eugenia squamiflora Mattos
 Eugenia sripadaense Kosterm.
 Eugenia stahlii (Kiaersk.) Krug & Urb.
 Eugenia standleyi McVaugh
 Eugenia staudtii Engl. & Brehmer
 Eugenia stenoptera Urb.
 Eugenia stenosepala Kiaersk.
 Eugenia stenosepaloides Mattos
 Eugenia stenoxipha Urb.
 Eugenia stephanophylla Baker f.
 Eugenia stereophylla Urb.
 Eugenia stewardsonii Britton
 Eugenia stibephylla N.Snow & Rabeh.
 Eugenia stictopetala DC.
 Eugenia stictophylla N.Snow & Razafimam.
 Eugenia stigmatosa DC.
 Eugenia stipitata McVaugh
 Eugenia stolonifera (D.Legrand & Mattos) Mazine
 Eugenia strellensis O.Berg
 Eugenia stricta Pancher ex Brongn. & Gris
 Eugenia strigipes O.Berg
 Eugenia sturrockii R.A.Howard
 Eugenia stylaris McVaugh
 Eugenia styphelioides (Schltr.) J.W.Dawson & N.Snow
 Eugenia subamplexicaulis DC.
 Eugenia subavenia O.Berg
 Eugenia subcordata Wight & Arn.
 Eugenia subdisticha Urb.
 Eugenia suberosa Cambess.
 Eugenia subglomerata (Kuntze) Sobral
 Eugenia subherbacea A.Chev.
 Eugenia submontana B.S.Amorim & M.Alves
 Eugenia subreticulata Glaz.
 Eugenia subspinulosa Borhidi & O.Muñiz
 Eugenia subterminalis DC.
 Eugenia subundulata Kiaersk.
 Eugenia sulcata Spring ex Mart.
 Eugenia sulcatifolia L.D.Meireles & Mazine
 Eugenia sulcivenia Krug & Urb.
 Eugenia sumbensis Greves
 Eugenia supraaxillaris Spring ex Mart.
 Eugenia suzukii Kaneh.
 Eugenia symphoricarpos McVaugh

T
 Eugenia tachirensis Steyerm.
 Eugenia tafelbergica Amshoff
 Eugenia talbotii Keay
 Eugenia tamaensis Steyerm.
 Eugenia tanaensis Verdc.
 Eugenia tapirorum Standl.
 Eugenia tchambaensis J.W.Dawson & N.Snow
 Eugenia teapensis McVaugh
 Eugenia tenuiflora Mazine
 Eugenia tenuimarginata McVaugh
 Eugenia tenuipedunculata Kiaersk.
 Eugenia tephrogyna Sobral & Proença
 Eugenia tepuiensis Steyerm.
 Eugenia teresa-ruiziana Villarroel & Faria
 Eugenia teresae J.F.Morales
 Eugenia ternatifolia Cambess.
 Eugenia terpnophylla Thwaites
 Eugenia tetramera (McVaugh) M.L.Kawas. & B.Holst
 Eugenia tetrasticha Poepp. ex O.Berg
 Eugenia theodorae Kiaersk.
 Eugenia thikaensis Verdc.
 Eugenia thollonii Amshoff
 Eugenia thouvenotiana H.Perrier
 Eugenia tiampoka N.Snow & Callm.
 Eugenia tikalana Lundell
 Eugenia tilarana Barrie
 Eugenia tinifolia Lam.
 Eugenia tisserantii Aubrév. & Pellegr.
 Eugenia tiwakaensis J.W.Dawson & N.Snow
 Eugenia toaensis Borhidi & O.Muñiz
 Eugenia togoensis Engl.
 Eugenia toledinensis Lundell
 Eugenia toledoi (Mattos) Mattos
 Eugenia tomasina Urb.
 Eugenia tonii Lundell
 Eugenia toxanatolica Verdc.
 Eugenia trahyra Barb.Rodr.
 Eugenia trichogyna Sobral, I.G.Costa & M.C.Souza
 Eugenia triflora (Jacq.) Ham.
 Eugenia trikii Lundell
 Eugenia trinervia Vahl
 Eugenia trinitatis DC.
 Eugenia tropophylla H.Perrier
 Eugenia truncata O.Berg
 Eugenia trunciflora (Schltdl. & Cham.) G.Don
 Eugenia tuberculata (Kunth) DC.
 Eugenia tulanan Merr.
 Eugenia tumescens B.S.Amorim & M.Alves
 Eugenia tumulescens McVaugh
 Eugenia tungo Hiern
 Eugenia turneri McVaugh

U
 Eugenia ulei (Diels) McVaugh
 Eugenia uliginosa Lundell
 Eugenia umbellata Spreng.
 Eugenia umbelliflora O.Berg
 Eugenia umbonata McVaugh
 Eugenia umbrosa O.Berg
 Eugenia uminganensis Peter G.Wilson
 Eugenia umtamvunensis A.E.van Wyk
 Eugenia unana Sobral
 Eugenia underwoodii Britton
 Eugenia undulata Aubl.
 Eugenia uniflora L.
 Eugenia uninervia Rusby
 Eugenia urschiana H.Perrier
 Eugenia ursina Lundell
 Eugenia uruguayensis Cambess.
 Eugenia uxpanapensis P.E.Sánchez & L.M.Ortega

V
 Eugenia vacana Lundell
 Eugenia valsuganana Sobral
 Eugenia valvata McVaugh
 Eugenia vanderveldei Urb. & Ekman
 Eugenia vanwykiana N.Snow
 Eugenia varia Britton & P.Wilson
 Eugenia variabilis Baill.
 Eugenia variareolata McVaugh
 Eugenia vatomandrensis H.Perrier
 Eugenia vaughanii J.Guého & A.J.Scott
 Eugenia veillonii N.Snow & Callm.
 Eugenia venezuelensis O.Berg
 Eugenia veraguensis Rod.Flores & A.Ibáñez
 Eugenia verapazensis Lundell
 Eugenia verdoorniae A.E.van Wyk
 Eugenia vernicosa O.Berg
 Eugenia verruculata Barrie
 Eugenia versicolor McVaugh
 Eugenia verticillata (Vell.) Angely
 Eugenia vesca Lundell
 Eugenia vetula DC.
 Eugenia victoriana Cuatrec.
 Eugenia victorinii Alain
 Eugenia vigiensis Urb.
 Eugenia viguieriana H.Perrier
 Eugenia vilersii H.Perrier
 Eugenia villae-novae Kiaersk.
 Eugenia violascens O.Berg
 Eugenia viridiflora Cambess.
 Eugenia viridis (Vell.) O.Berg
 Eugenia virotii Guillaumin
 Eugenia viscacea Sobral

W
 Eugenia wallenii Macfad.
 Eugenia warmingiana Kiaersk.
 Eugenia websteri Proctor
 Eugenia wentii Amshoff
 Eugenia whytei Sprague
 Eugenia widgrenii Sond. ex O.Berg
 Eugenia williamsiana N.Snow
 Eugenia wilsonella Fawc. & Rendle
 Eugenia wilsoniana N.Snow
 Eugenia winzerlingii Standl.
 Eugenia woodburyana Alain
 Eugenia woodfrediana Urb.
 Eugenia woodii Dummer
 Eugenia wullschlaegeliana Amshoff
 Eugenia wynadensis Bedd.

X
 Eugenia xalapensis (Kunth) DC.
 Eugenia xanthoxyloides Cambess.
 Eugenia xilitlensis McVaugh
 Eugenia xiriricana Mattos
 Eugenia xystophylla O.Berg

Y
 Eugenia yangambensis Amshoff
 Eugenia yasuniana B.Holst & M.L.Kawas.
 Eugenia yatuae (McVaugh) B.Holst
 Eugenia yautepecana Lundell
 Eugenia yumana Alain
 Eugenia yunckeri Standl.

Z
 Eugenia zelayensis P.E.Sánchez
 Eugenia zuccarinii O.Berg
 Eugenia zuchowskiae Barrie
 Eugenia zuluensis Dummer
 Eugenia zygophylla Govaerts

References

L
Eugenia